Colt is a set of open-source Libraries for High Performance Scientific and Technical Computing written in Java and developed at CERN. Colt was developed with a focus on High Energy Physics, but is applicable to many other problems.  Colt was last updated in 2004 (when Java 1.4 was the current release) and its code base has been incorporated into the Parallel Colt code base, which has received more recent development.

Colt provides an infrastructure for scalable scientific and technical computing in Java. It is particularly useful in the domain of High Energy Physics at CERN. It contains, among others, efficient and usable data structures and algorithms for Off-line and On-line Data Analysis, Linear Algebra, Multi-dimensional arrays, Statistics, Histogramming, Monte Carlo Simulation, Parallel & Concurrent Programming. It summons some of the best concepts, designs and implementations thought up over time by the community, ports or improves them and introduces new approaches where need arises.

Capabilities 

The following is an overview of Colt's capabilities, as listed on the project's website:

Usage Example 

Example of Singular Value Decomposition (SVD):
SingularValueDecomposition s = new SingularValueDecomposition(matA);
DoubleMatrix2D U = s.getU();
DoubleMatrix2D S = s.getS();
DoubleMatrix2D V = s.getV();

Example of matrix multiplication:
Algebra alg = new Algebra();
DoubleMatrix2D result = alg.mult(matA,matB);

References

Java (programming language) libraries
CERN software